Jang Dong-joo (born October 25, 1994) is a South Korean actor. He is best known for his role in the television series Loss Time Life and film Honest Candidate.

Filmography

TV series

Film

References

External links
 
 

1994 births
Living people
21st-century South Korean male actors
South Korean male television actors
South Korean male film actors
Sejong University alumni